Pavel Yakovlev may refer to:

 Pavel Yakovlev (athlete) (born 1958), Soviet runner
 Pavel Yakovlev (footballer) (born 1991), Russian footballer

See also
 Yakovlev (surname)